Zheng Xiaolong (born November 30, 1953) is a Chinese TV and film director and screenwriter.

Selected filmography
Stories from the Editorial Board (1991)—China's first sitcom
A Native of Beijing in New York (1992)—first Chinese TV series shot in the US, see Beijinger in New York
The Gua Sha Treatment (2001)
Golden Marriage (2008)
Chuncao (2008)
I'm a Boss (2009)
Empresses in the Palace (2011)
Red Sorghum (2014)
The Legend of Mi Yue (2015)

Awards

References

External links

1953 births
Living people
Chinese film directors
Chinese television directors